De La Salle College Caringbah is an independent Roman Catholic comprehensive single-sex secondary day school for boys, located in Caringbah, a southern suburb of Sydney, New South Wales, Australia. Established in 1958 by the De La Salle Brothers, the college currently caters for over 500 students from Year 7 to Year 10. The current principal is Peter Buxton.

History 
De La Salle Caringbah was established in 1958 as a Years 5–10 boys school and eventually settled to educate Year 7–10 students. Our Lady of Mercy College, Burraneer Bay is the Years 7-10 girls school. Students from both schools then transfer to De La Salle Catholic College Cronulla for Years 11–12.

De La Salle Caringbah was founded after there was thought to be a need for a Catholic Boys High School in the area. On 28 January 1958, 65 students began the first class in the basement of the old Our Lady of Fatima Church. By 1963 the current college building was built.

Principals

Houses
At DLSCCC there are 5 houses: Benildis, Dermot, Kilian, Miguel, and Soloman.

Notable former students 

John Della Bosca - politician
 Jonathan Docking - Rugby League player
 Andrew Ettingshausen - Rugby League player
 Steve Hutchins- Senator and ALP president
 John Lee - former Director General of the NSW Department of Premier and Cabinet
 Michael Lee - former Federal Minister
 Jaeman Salmon - Rugby League player
 Tony Sheldon - trade union official
 Mark Vincent - opera singer (winner of Australia's Got Talent 2009)

See also 

 List of Catholic schools in New South Wales
 Lasallian educational institutions
 Catholic education in Australia

References

External links
School Website
 Official college Facebook page De La Salle Catholic College Caringbah

1958 establishments in Australia
Catholic secondary schools in Sydney
Caringbah
Caringbah South, New South Wales
Educational institutions established in 1958